Adamantios Androutsopoulos (20 August 1919 – 10 November 2000) was a lawyer and professor. He held various ministerial posts under the Greek military junta of 1967–1974 and was finally appointed as the 168th Prime Minister of Greece from 1973 to 1974 by junta strongman Dimitrios Ioannides.

He was born in Psari, Messenia, Greece in 1919. He studied at the University of Athens and at the University of Chicago. He never graduated from Chicago. He was Finance Minister (21 April 1967 – 26 August 1971) and Minister for the Interior (26 August 1971 – 10 May 1973) during the Papadopoulos military régime. When Papadopoulos was overthrown in 1973 by Ioannides, Androutsopoulos was appointed Head of Government (25 November 1973 – 23 July 1974), and also Finance Minister (25 November 1973 – 26 July 1974), until the return of democratic government in 1974 during the Metapolitefsi.

References

1919 births
2000 deaths
20th-century prime ministers of Greece
20th-century Greek lawyers
National and Kapodistrian University of Athens alumni
Prime Ministers of Greece
Greek educators
Ministers of the Interior of Greece
Leaders of the Greek junta
Finance ministers of Greece
University of Chicago alumni
People from Messenia
Greek expatriates in the United States